France Castel, née Bégin (born August 31, 1944) in Sherbrooke, Quebec) is a Canadian singer, actress and broadcaster.

Music
Castel began in the music business by recording an album, Toi et moi amoureux, as a duo with Jean Beaulne of Les Baronets. The album spawned popular Quebec hits with "Sous notre toit" and the title track. For the next number of years, Castel recorded and performed mainly songs written by Christine Charbonneau, including "Du fil des aiguilles et du coton", "Château de sable", "Sur le pont", "Je le vois dans ma soupe", "Dominique", "Au fond de nous" and "L'amitié". Later in the 1970s, she began writing her own songs, inspired by blues music.

She recorded seven solo albums through the 1970s: Du fil, des aiguilles et du coton (1973), To One and All (1973), Je le vois dans ma soupe (1973), Moi j'veux pas déranger personne (1974), Quand on aime on a toujours 20 ans (1975), En corps à cœur (1976) and Noël disco (1977).

Acting
In the 1970s, she began to take acting roles, starting with the television series Du Tac au Tac and Féminin pluriel.<ref>"Première présentation de la série humoristique «Féminin pluriel»". Bilan du siècle (Université de Sherbrooke).</ref> Her later television roles included the series Omertà and Sous un ciel variable.

In musical theatre, she played the role of Stella Spotlight in a 1980 production of Starmania. In 1986, she played Marlene Dietrich in a production of Normand Mongeon and Roch Harvey's Le Phenonène M. Her subsequent musical theatre roles included Betty Bird in Michel Tremblay's Demain matin, Montréal m'attend and Janine in Marc Drouin and François Dompierre's I.

She appeared in films including An Imaginary Tale (Une histoire inventée), The Wind from Wyoming (Le vent du Wyoming), Karmina, The Countess of Baton Rouge (La Comtesse du Bâton Rouge), Heads or Tails (J'en suis!), Ice Cream, Chocolate and Other Consolations (Crème glacée, chocolat et autres consolations) and When I Will Be Gone (L'Âge de braise). At the 18th Genie Awards in 1997, she received two simultaneous nominations for Best Supporting Actress, for both Karmina and The Countess of Baton Rouge.

In 1999, she played Linda in a French-language production of Death of a Salesman at Montreal's Théâtre Jean-Duceppe.

Broadcasting career
In the 2000s, she became a radio and television host, beginning as cohost with France Beaudoin of the daytime talk show Deux filles le matin for TVA. In 2005 she moved to Société Radio-Canada, the French-language arm of the Canadian Broadcasting Corporation, where she hosted the morning talk show Droit au cœur in 2005, cohosted the variety series Pour le plaisir with Michel Barrette from 2007 to 2014, and hosted a blues music program for Espace musique.

She published an autobiography, Ici et maintenant, in 2016.

Discography
AlbumsDu fil, des aiguilles et du coton (1973)To One and All (1973)Je le vois dans ma soupe (1973)Moi j'veux pas déranger personne (1974)Quand on aime on a toujours 20 ans (1975)En corps à cœur (1976)Noël disco'' (1977)

Filmography

Film

Television

References

External links

1944 births
20th-century Canadian actresses
20th-century Canadian non-fiction writers
21st-century Canadian actresses
21st-century Canadian non-fiction writers
Canadian women rock singers
Canadian women pop singers
Canadian blues singers
Canadian film actresses
Canadian television actresses
Canadian stage actresses
Canadian musical theatre actresses
Canadian songwriters
Canadian autobiographers
Canadian women non-fiction writers
Musicians from Sherbrooke
Actresses from Quebec
Writers from Sherbrooke
Living people
Canadian radio hosts
Canadian television talk show hosts
Canadian television variety show hosts
Canadian Broadcasting Corporation people
French-language singers of Canada
Canadian non-fiction writers in French
20th-century Canadian women singers
21st-century Canadian women singers
20th-century Canadian women writers
21st-century Canadian women writers
Women autobiographers
Canadian women radio hosts